Lycée Jean Jaurès is a sixth-form college/senior high school in Montreuil, Seine-Saint-Denis, France in the Paris metropolitan area. School built from 1960 by the architect Jacques Carlu in the area of Murs à pêches and Opened in 1964. The school was designed for 2600 students. The high school is only one of the five schools in Montreuil.

References

External links
 Lycée Jean Jaurès 

Lycées in Seine-Saint-Denis
Jean Jaurès